The Kunstverein Nürnberg (art association Nuremberg, official name "Kunstverein Nürnberg - Albrecht Dürer Gesellschaft e.V.") is a venue for exhibitions of contemporary art. The association was founded in 1792 and is Germany's oldest arts association.

The association's exhibition space is situated in a building designed 1930 by architect Otto Ernst Schweizer, well known for buildings such as the Ernst-Happel-Stadion.

The gallery shows a wide range of international contemporary artistic positions.

Past exhibitions (selection):
 2015 Transparencies - Neil Beloufa, Juliette Blightman, Ryan Gander, Calla Henkel & Max Pitegoff, David Horvitz, Metahaven, Katja Novitskova and Yuri Pattison 
 2011 Phyllida Barlow - Cast 
 2010 Shahryar Nashat - Line up

References

External links 
 

Museums in Nuremberg
Modern art museums in Germany
Art museums and galleries in Germany
Art galleries established in 1792
1792 establishments in the Holy Roman Empire